U. K. Kumaran (born 11 May 1950) is a Malayalam-language novelist, short story writer, essayist and journalist from Kerala, India. He is a recipient of the Kerala Sahitya Akademi Award and Vayalar Award.

Biography

According to The Hindu, the short story "Chalanam" "is a comprehensive landscape, peopled with characters and nature. Each character should grow and reach a point where they move towards a climax well. You cannot leave them mid-way, unfinished."

Awards
Kumaran has received the Kerala Sahitya Akademi Award for Policukarante Penmakkal (2011) and Vaikom Chandrasekharan Nair Award for Thakshankunnu Swaroopam (2012). Vayalar Award 2016.

Works

Novels
 Valayam

 Oridathum Ethathavar
 Mulappaal
 Aasakthi
 Ezhuthappettathu
 Ottavaakkil Oru Jivitam
 Thakshankunnu Swaroopam
 Kananullathalla Kazhchakkal
 Madutha kali

Short story collections
 Puthiya Irippidangal
 Madutha Kali
 Paavam Kallan
 Atayalangal Vannukondirikkunnu
 Rail Palathil Oru Kudumbam Dhyanikkunnu
 Achchan Urangunnilla
 Orale Thedi Oraal
 Ottakkoru Stri Odunnathinte Rahasyamenth?
 Onninum Orakalavumilla
 Veedu Samsarikkunnu
 Madhu Shaityam
 Madhye Ingane Kaanunna Nerath
 Matibhramangalude Kaalam
 Kudumba Museum
 Policukaarante Penmakkal
 Tiranjedutha Kathakal
 Sancharikkunna Govani
 Priyappetta Kathakal
 Kannadakalkkappurath
 Valanja Kaalulla Kuta
 Dambathya Katha
  Viraamasandhi

Novelettes
 Malarnnu Parakkunna Kakka
 Prasava Ward
 Ellam Kanunna Njan
 Oro Viliyum Kaathu
 Kaanaappurangal
 Addheham
 Bhoothakaala Sancharam
 A. T. M.
 Viralatayalangal Illathavarude Nagaram
 Priyappetta Novelettukal
 Dinaratrangalude Ennam
 Sanghaditham

Others
 Gandhiji (Biography)
 Oru Bandhu Kaathirukkunnu (Memoirs)
 Anubhavam, Orma, Yathra (Memoirs and Travel notes)

References

External links
 Article on U. K. Kumaran (The Hindu)
 Valanja Kalulla Kuda (Story by U. K. Kumaran) (Madhyamam Weekly)
 A memoir by U. K. Kumaran from the book Adhyayana Yathra (Mathrubhumi Books)
 Review of Anubhavam, Orma, Yathra (Mangalam)
 U. K Kumaran won Cherukad Award 2014

1950 births
Living people
Malayalam-language writers
Malayalam novelists
Malayalam short story writers
People from Kozhikode district
Novelists from Kerala
Recipients of the Kerala Sahitya Akademi Award
Malayalam-language journalists
20th-century Indian short story writers
Journalists from Kerala
Indian male journalists
Indian male novelists
Indian male short story writers
20th-century Indian novelists
20th-century Indian male writers